The DSR-Precision DSR-50 is a bullpup bolt-action anti-materiel rifle developed and manufactured by DSR-Precision GmbH and chambered in .50 BMG. It is essentially an upscaled DSR-1.

Design and features
The DSR-50 is based on DSR-Precision's earlier DSR-1, and includes modifications necessary to fire the more powerful .50 BMG, including a hydraulic recoil buffer in the buttstock and an innovative muzzle attachment. This muzzle device, described as a 'blast compensator', is a combination sound suppressor and muzzle brake, and is notable in its attempt at moderating the .50 BMG's muzzle blast and recoil, unlike contemporary large-caliber rifles, which are typically equipped with muzzle brakes only. Like the DSR-1, this rifle retains its bullpup configuration, allowing a longer barrel while retaining a shorter overall length (OAL), which is an important consideration for large caliber rounds such as .50 BMG, and focuses the weapon's balance towards the buttstock, compensating for the muzzle's heavy attachments standard on the DSR-50. The DSR-50 also retains some of the DSR-1's features, such as a top mounted bipod, "butt spike" monopod, free-floating barrel, fully adjustable cheekrest and buttstock, and forward magazine holder.

See also
 List of bullpup firearms
 List of sniper rifles

References

.50 BMG sniper rifles
Bolt-action rifles
Bullpup rifles
Post–Cold War weapons of Germany
Sniper rifles of Germany
Anti-materiel rifles